Wojciech Ziółkowski (born 17 October 1984) is a Polish professional racing cyclist. In July 2017, he attempted to break the hour record. Despite failing to set a new world record, he did set a new Polish record of 49.470 km. He rode in the men's individual pursuit event at the 2020 UCI Track Cycling World Championships in Berlin, Germany.

Major results
2007
 7th Memoriał Andrzeja Trochanowskiego
2011
 3rd Time trial, National Road Championships
 10th Overall Dookoła Mazowsza
 10th Puchar Ministra Obrony Narodowej

References

External links
 

1984 births
Living people
Polish male cyclists
Place of birth missing (living people)